Evald Seepere (born Seeberg, 4 May 1911 – 22 February 1990) was an Estonian amateur featherweight boxer. He competed in the 1934 European Championships and 1936 Summer Olympics, but was eliminated in a second-round bout. Seepere studied in Moscow in 1942–43, and later for 43 years worked as a boxing coach in Estonia.

1936 Olympic results

 Round of 32: defeated Nicolae Berechet (Romania) on points
 Round of 16: lost to Theodore Kara (United States) on points

References 

1911 births
1990 deaths
People from the Governorate of Estonia
Estonian male boxers
Featherweight boxers
Olympic boxers of Estonia
Boxers at the 1936 Summer Olympics
20th-century Estonian people